Gamov or Gamow is a Russian masculine surname originating from the word gam, meaning noise, shouting, its feminine counterpart is Gamova or Gamowa. It may refer to:

Dmitry Gamov (1834–1903), Russian explorer 
George Gamow (1904–1968), Russian-born physicist and cosmologist
Igor Gamow (born 1936), American inventor, son of George Gamow
Vitaly Gamov (1962–2002), Russian Border Guard Official
Yekaterina Gamova (born 1980), Russian volleyball player

References

Russian-language surnames